Aleksandra Melnichenko (born 21 April 1977) is a Serbian billionaire, philanthropist and a former singer and model. She is the wife of Russian billionaire entrepreneur Andrey Melnichenko.

Early life
Aleksandra Nikolić was born and grew up in Belgrade, the capital of former Yugoslavia, to a Serbian father and a Croatian mother. Her father was an architectural engineer and her mother was an artist. Since the breakup of Yugoslavia, Aleksandra held both Serbian and Croatian citizenship.

Sandra was educated at the 11th Belgrade Gymnasium, prior to enrolling in the Faculty of International Management in Belgrade.

Career
At the age of 15, while still in high school and before enrolling into Belgrade University’s Faculty of Management, Aleksandra launched herself into a successful first career in fashion, winning international recognition as a model and, from 1996, regional fame as a member of the original cast of the Balkans’ leading girl band “Models”. She returned to full-time modelling in 1998, working with leading international agencies while living in Europe’s fashion capitals.

Aleksandra Melnichenko has focused on philanthropy, mainly supporting children’s education and the arts. The family’s foundation and the companies the Melnichenko family invested in have over time donated nearly 500 million US dollars to charity.

Personal life
In 2003, in France, Aleksandra met entrepreneur and investor Andrey Melnichenko. The couple married two years after their first meeting, in September 2005, and started to spend an international life between different continents and countries. 

Aleksandra and Andrey have since welcomed a daughter (2012) and a son (2017).

Aleksandra and Andrey Melnichenko own two superyachts designed by Philip Starck: Sailing Yacht A and Motor Yacht A which reportedly cost $500 million and $350 million to build, respectively, and are considered to be "one of the most advanced superyachts on the water" with "environmentally-friendly innovations."

References

Russian billionaires
Russian people of Serbian descent
Russian people of Croatian descent
Living people
Serbian female models
Serbian people of Croatian descent
1977 births
Serbian emigrants to Russia
Singers from Belgrade
Models from Belgrade